Barbara Kessler (born 1962) is an American folk-rock singer-songwriter. She began her career performing in clubs on Cape Cod and driving an ice cream truck, then began performing at open mikes in Boston, and continues to be part of the Boston folk scene.   Perhaps her best-known composition is "Deep Country", which first appeared on 1994's live Stranger to this Land.

She was also featured in the 2005 video game Rogue Galaxy in which she performs the theme song "Dreaming My Way Home".

Discography
Barbara Kessler Live (1992)
Stranger to This Land (1994)
Notion (1996)
Barbara Kessler (2000)
What You Keep (2012)

Compilations
Fast Folk, Boston Revisited (1992)
Big Times in a Small Town, Rounder (1992)
Follow That Road, Rounder (1993)
Grooves 2, Time Life Music, Warner Special Products (1995)
Woman's Work, Putumayo World Music (1996)
Life, AAA (1996)
This Is Boston, Not Austin (1997)
Big League Babe: The Christine Lavin Tribute Album, Pt. 1 (1997)
Women of Kerrville, Vol. 2 (1999)
Respond (1999)
Kerville End of the Century (2000)
Folk For Stroke (2006)
Paint It Black: An Alt Country Tribute To The Rolling Stones (2011)

References

External links
Official web site

Musicians from Boston
American women singers
American folk musicians
Living people
Fast Folk artists
American women songwriters
Songwriters from Massachusetts
1962 births
21st-century American women